Jessie Daniels is the debut and only  studio album by American singer Jessie Daniels.  It was released in 2006 by Midas Records.

Track listing

Singles
 The Noise
 Everyday
 What I Hear
 Hello/Goodbye

2006 albums